Jessy Hodges (born August 8, 1986) is an American actress. She played Sophie Parker in the web series Anyone But Me. She is the daughter of The Evil Dead star Ellen Sandweiss.

Biography
Hodges lives in Los Angeles and is originally from Huntington Woods, Michigan. She studied drama at New York University's Tisch School of the Arts. About her acting career, Hodges said that she was very involved in theater during the early years of her life. She also said she has a strong connection to her mother. Her mother Ellen Sandweiss went to school for theater and is also an actress. Hodges and her mother starred in Satan's Playground together. Hodges married her boyfriend and former SNL cast member Beck Bennett on August 25, 2018.

For her work in the critically acclaimed web series Anyone But Me, Hodges was nominated for an Indie Soap Award in the breakthrough performance category. The storyline pertinent to her character Sophie's sexual questioning was nominated for best storyline in the same year. Her other Web video work includes appearing in several sketches by comedy duo BriTANicK, including their famous "Academy Award Winning Movie Trailer."

In 2013, Hodges is featured in Chris Lowell's directorial debut Beside Still Waters.

She has also appeared in the seventh episode of Grey's Anatomys season 9 as a guest star.

Filmography

Film

Television

Selected theatre
The Metal Children at the Vineyard Theatre
The Great Recession at the Flea Theater
Misery and Good Fortune at HERE Arts
A workshop of Gilgamesh's Game with New Georges

References

External links
 

1986 births
Living people
American television actresses
Tisch School of the Arts alumni
People from Huntington Woods, Michigan
American stage actresses
Actresses from Michigan
21st-century American actresses